Priapichthys is a genus of poeciliid fishes native to Costa Rica, Panama and Colombia.

Species
There are currently seven recognized species in this genus:
 Priapichthys annectens (Regan, 1907)
 Priapichthys caliensis (C. H. Eigenmann & Henn, 1916)
 Priapichthys chocoensis (Henn, 1916)
 Priapichthys darienensis (Meek & Hildebrand, 1913)
 Priapichthys nigroventralis (C. H. Eigenmann & Henn, 1912)
 Priapichthys panamensis Meek & Hildebrand, 1916
 Priapichthys puetzi M. K. Meyer & Etzel, 1996

References

Poeciliidae
Freshwater fish genera
Freshwater fish of Central America
Freshwater fish of South America
Ray-finned fish genera
Taxa named by Charles Tate Regan